The Turin metropolitan area is the urban agglomeration centred on the city of Turin in the Piedmont region of north-west Italy. It is defined statistically and does not correspond to a single area of local government. Administratively it comprises the comune (municipality) of Turin plus 53 further communes, all of which fall within the Metropolitan City of Turin.

The metropolitan area has a total population of 1,646,064 estimated by the OECD and an area of 1,127 km², giving a density of 1,461 people per square kilometre. It is the fourth most populous metropolitan area in Italy. 51% of the population lives within the city of Turin.

Composition
The Turin metropolitan area includes the city of Turin and 53 municipalities, the most important of these by population are Turin, Moncalieri, Collegno, Rivoli, Settimo Torinese and Nichelino:

References

Metropolitan areas of Italy
Metropolitan City of Turin
Turin